Anders Christian Andersson (born 25 June 1952 in Malmö) is a Swedish actor.

Filmography
1997 - King Lear
1997 - Ogifta par
2001 - Återkomsten
2003 - Järnvägshotellet (TV)
2006 - LasseMajas detektivbyrå (TV series)

References

External links

Living people
Swedish male actors
1952 births
Actors from Malmö